Christopher P. Manfredi (born 24 March 1959) is a professor of political science, acting Principal and Provost and Vice-Principal Academic at McGill University, Montreal, Quebec,  Canada. From 2006 to 2015 he served as McGill's Dean of Arts. He studied at the University of Calgary and received his PhD from Claremont Graduate School. His research focuses on judicial politics in Canada. In his publications, he has often warned against the dangers of judicial activism by the Supreme Court of Canada.

In 2010 Manfredi was appointed by the Prime Minister to the Governor General Consultation Committee, a special committee convened to recommend a successor to Michaëlle Jean. The Panel recommended David Lloyd Johnston.

References

Academic staff of McGill University
University of Calgary alumni
Claremont Graduate University alumni
Living people
1959 births